Julie Halard-Decugis and Ai Sugiyama were the defending champions, but Halard-Decugis retired from professional tennis at the end of the 2000 season.

Sugiyama teamed up with Kim Clijsters and lost in the final to Cara Black and Liezel Huber, with a score of 6–1, 6–3. It was the first ever participation for Black and Huber as a team, as well as their first title.

Seeds

Draw

Draw

References

External links
 Official results archive (ITF)
 Official results archive (WTA)

Doubles
Toyota Princess Cup - Doubles